Contest logging software refers to specialized computer software programs designed for use by competitors in amateur radio contesting.  Most contest logging software is written by individual programmers who are active radio contesters.

Purpose 
The primary purpose of contest logging software is to record the details of two-way radio contacts made during amateur radio contests.  At a minimum, these details include the time, band or frequency of operation, the call sign of the other station, and the received "exchange" data.  This log data is recorded in a binary or ASCII format.  Most contest logging software packages will also compute a running score for the contest during operation and will help track which multipliers have been "worked" and which have not.  Typical contest logging software includes features for post-contest processing of the log to prepare it for submission to the contest sponsor.  There is great variation in the features offered and their specific implementation, which can lead to passionate debates among the supporters of specific software packages.

Common features 
Many programs offer advanced features for controlling external devices; this can include controlling the frequency of a radio, sending Morse code over a serial port or parallel port interface, interfacing with sound cards used for the transmission and reception of digital modes such as RTTY, or controlling antenna or amplifier hardware.  Some software programs include specific features for single operator two radios (SO2R) operations.  A related market exists for software designed to analyze, convert, or manipulate log data recorded during radio contests.

Contest logging software, whether free or commercial, is available for DOS, Linux, and Windows platforms.  Some contesters dedicate older computers specifically to running their favorite contest logging software.

Available software packages 
The following contest logging software packages are widely used and available.  Some are offered for sale, and others are available without charge under various licenses.

Contest Loggers - Current

Free
HamRacer Uses synthesized voice keyer
N1MM Logger
QARTest
SD by EI5DI
TR4W
VK Contest Log Mostly Australasian contests with some international events
TLF by PA0R, now maintained by DL1JBE Linux
DXLog - free since 2019

Free - VHF-Only
MINOS by G0GJV For European VHF/UHF contests
RoverLog by N1MU Multiplatform, VHF/UHF for fixed stations and rovers - Not updated since 2017
Tucnak by OK1ZIA Linux Multiplatform, VHF (Limited HF support)

Commercial
N3FJP Log
Win-Test by F5MZN
WriteLog by W5XD

Legacy Contest Loggers - not in Development
CQ/X de NO5W GPS Enabled for Mobile Contesting
KLog Linux
MobileLog by N0HR PocketPC/Windows Mobile PDA
NA by K8CC DOS
TR Log by N6TR DOS
VHFCONT by KC6TEU
VHFCTest4Win by S52AA VHF Reg1Test
VHFTEST by WG3E

Post-contest log analysis and conversion software
Contest LogChecker by UU0JC
LM contestsoftware by DL8WAA - Legacy, not updated since 2013
JARL eLog Maker - Legacy, not updated in many years
LogConv by KA5WSS
LogView by EI8IC - Legacy, not updated since 2011]
QScope online log analyzer for statistics and charts by XV4Y
SH5 log analyzer

References 

Allison, George K5IJ (1985).  "The Super Duper--Part 1".  QST.  Sep. 1985, p. 27.
Allison, George K5IJ (1985).  "The Super Duper--Part 2".  QST.  Nov. 1985, p. 44.
"eHam User Reviews" of logging software.
Newstead, Richard G3CWI (2001).  "Contest Software Reviewed".  Retrieved Dec. 7, 2005.

External links 
 Logging Software by AC6V
 Contesting Software  complete list by The DXZone

Amateur radio software
Radiosport